This is a list of the presidents of the Islamic Republic of Iran since the establishment of that office in 1980.  The president of Iran is the highest popularly elected official in the country. The current president is Ebrahim Raisi, in office since 3 August 2021.

Background
After the Iranian Revolution of 1979 and referendum to create the Islamic Republic on March 29 and 30, the new government needed to craft a new constitution.  Ayatollah Ruhollah Khomeini, ordered an election for the Assembly of Experts, the body tasked with writing the constitution.  The assembly presented the constitution on October 24, 1979, and Supreme Leader Ruhollah Khomeini and Prime Minister Mehdi Bazargan approved it. This was also approved in December 1979 constitutional referendum.

The 1979 Constitution designated the supreme leader as the head of state and the president and prime minister as the heads of government.  The post of prime minister was abolished in 1989.

The first Iranian presidential election was held on January 25, 1980 and resulted in the election of Abulhassan Banisadr with 76% of the votes.  Banisadr was impeached on June 22, 1981 by Parliament.  Until the early election on July 24, 1981, the duties of the president were undertaken by the Provisional Presidential Council. Mohammad-Ali Rajai was elected president on July 24, 1981 and took office on August 2.  Rajai remained in office for less than one month, with both he and his prime minister being assassinated on August 30, 1981. Once again, a Provisional Presidential Council filled the office until October 13, 1981 when Ali Khamenei was elected president.

Ali Khamenei, Akbar Hashemi Rafsanjani, Mohammad Khatami, Mahmoud Ahmadinejad and Hassan Rouhani were each elected president for two terms. Ebrahim Raisi is the current president, being elected in the June 2021 presidential election.

List

Timeline

See also
Supreme Leader of Iran
President of Iran
List of vice presidents of Iran
List of heads of state of Iran
List of prime ministers of Iran
List of speakers of the Parliament of Iran

References

Iran
Government of Iran
 
Presidents